Devanampriya, also Devanampiya  (Devanagiri          देवनामप्रिय ) (Brahmi script: 𑀤𑁂𑀯𑀸𑀦𑀁𑀧𑀺𑀬, Devānaṃpiya), was a Pali honorific epithet used by a few Indian monarchs, but most particularly the 3rd Mauryan Emperor Ashoka The Great (r.269-233 BCE) in his inscriptions (the Edicts of Ashoka). "Devanampriya" means "Beloved of the Gods".  It is often used by Ashoka in conjunction with the title Priyadasi, which means "He who regards others with kindness", "Humane"

However, this title was used by a number of Ceylonese kings from Uttiya to Yasalalakatissa from the 2nd century BC to the 1st century CE.

The Kalsi version of the Major Rock Edict No.8 also uses the title "Devampriyas" to describe previous kings (whereas the other versions use the term "Kings"), suggesting that the title "Denampriya" had a rather wide usage and might just have meant "King".

Prinsep in his study and decipherment of the Edicts of Ashoka had originally identified Devanampriya Priyadasi with the King of Ceylon Devanampiya Tissa of Anuradhapura. However, in 1837, George Turnour discovered Sri Lankan manuscripts (Dipavamsa, or "Island Chronicle" ) associating Piyadasi with Ashoka:

Since then, the association of "Devanampriya Priyadarsin" with Ashoka was reinforced through various inscriptions, and especially confirmed in the Minor Rock Edict inscription discovered in Maski, associating Ashoka with Devanampriya:

Historical Usage
Devānaṃpiya may refer to:

Devanampiya Tissa of Anuradhapura (died 267 BCE), ruler of Sri Lanka based at the ancient capital of Anuradhapura from 307 to 267 BC
Ashoka (ca. 304–232 BCE), Indian emperor of the Maurya Dynasty
Dasharatha Maurya (ca. 232 to 224 BCE), grandson of Ashoka, in his Barabar caves inscriptions, in the form "Devanampiya Dasaratha".
Vāṉavar aṉpaṉ, early Tamil for "the One who is Loved by the Gods" - title of a Tamil Chera chieftain of early historic south India.

References

Edicts of Ashoka